De pura sangre (English title:Of pure blood) is a Mexican telenovela produced by Ernesto Alonso for Televisa in 1985. Its original story of María Zarattini and directed by José Rendón.

Christian Bach and Humberto Zurita starred as protagonists, while Enrique Álvarez Félix, Manuel Ojeda and Víctor Junco starred as antagonists.

Plot
In the "San Joaquin" ranch, located in the village of San Miguel Allende, millionaire dies Solis Don Alberto Duarte, owner of a large fortune and a prosperous farm where horses are bred thoroughbred. Its closest relative is his niece, Florence, who will marry his ambitious promises, Leonardo. This is the promise very happy thinking that his future wife will own a fortune, but, to his horror, Florencia will inherit only a small part of the money; the rest of the fortune of Don Alberto and the estate will pass into the hands of a stranger from Madrid, Alberto Salerno.

Homero, uncle of Leonardo interested as he performs plans for Alberto is arrested for drug trafficking on the way to Mexico. Meanwhile, Leonardo married Florencia and encouraged to contest the will due to the absence of the primary heir, and so she becomes mistress of everything but name only. However, almost a year later, Alberto escapes from prison during a fire and heads to San Miguel Allende with the idea of revenge in mind.

His prime suspect is obviously Florencia, for she knew he was on his way and also had reason to remove it. Alberto, who was police, begins his investigation. The name of Marcos gets, and gets a job as a laborer on the farm that is technically theirs. Florencia, trapped in a marriage that has not been consummated, is attracted to the new worker.

Cast 
 
Christian Bach as Florencia Duarte Valencia
Humberto Zurita as Alberto Salerno del Villar/Marcos Mejía
Enrique Álvarez Félix as Leonardo Altamirano
José Antonio Ferral as Fulgencio
Manuel Ojeda as Carlos Meléndez
Delia Casanova as Laura Blanchet
Luis Xavier as Felipe
Alicia Rodríguez as Beatriz Valencia Vda. de Duarte
Víctor Junco as Homero Altamirano
Arsenio Campos as Diego Bustamante
Miguel Macía as Father Francisco Alvear
Margarita Gralia as Andrea
Ofelia Cano as Carmelita
Jacarandá Alfaro as Chuy
Maristel Molina as Ángela
Carmen Cortés as Josefina
Graciela Lara as Amparo
Alberto Macías as Camilo
Alejandro Ruiz as Agustín
Fidel Garriga as Nicolás
Thalía Salas as Regina
Guillermo García Cantú as Anselmo Bustamante
Josefina Castellanos as Lulú
Raúl Morales as Lic. Hernández
Tito Guízar as Juan
Claudia Inchaurregui as Ana María Salerno
José Chávez as Teniente González
José Luis Llamas as Bernal
Carlos Guerra as Javier
Alfonso Kaffiti as Mario Salerno
Jorge Victoria as Police's chief
Adalberto Parra as Hampón
Joaquín Gallegos
Miguel Angel Negrete as Teniente Gallegos
Rosa Elena Díaz as Rosa del Villar
Julia Marichal
Arturo Laphan 
Carl Hillos
Fortino Salazar

Awards

References

External links

1985 telenovelas
Mexican telenovelas
1985 Mexican television series debuts
1986 Mexican television series endings
Spanish-language telenovelas
Television shows set in Mexico
Televisa telenovelas